Kelly O'Sullivan (born 1983/1984) is an American actress, screenwriter and producer. She wrote and starred in Saint Frances (2019), which won the Audience Award and the Special Jury Award at 2019 SXSW Film Festival.

Biography 
O'Sullivan was born and raised in Little Rock, Arkansas to an accountant mother and a father who worked in health insurance. She was raised Irish Catholic and attended Immaculate Conception school until eighth grade.

O'Sullivan always wanted to be an actor and supported by her cinephile parents, she performed in local children's theatre plays from age five.
She studied theatre at Northwestern University and is also an alumna of the Steppenwolf Theatre Company's School at Steppenwolf in Chicago.

Inspired by Greta Gerwig, who directed Lady Bird, O'Sullivan wrote Saint Frances based on the experiences she had while working as a nanny to support her struggling acting career in her 20s and an abortion she had in her early thirties. She started work on the script in January 2018, already intending the film to be directed by partner Alex Thompson. She wrote the parts for the lesbian parents in the film for actors Lily Mojekwu and Charin Alvarez.

O'Sullivan's next project, to be co-directed with Thompson, is about a friendship between girls in high school.

Personal life 
O'Sullivan is in a relationship with director Alex Thompson. She identifies as an agnostic feminist. She has stated that her favourite film is Abbott and Costello Meet Frankenstein (1948).

Filmography

Films

Television

Video games

References

External links 
 

21st-century American actresses
American women screenwriters
American women film producers
People from Little Rock, Arkansas
Living people
Date of birth missing (living people)
Year of birth missing (living people)